Harriet is a 2019 American biographical film directed by Kasi Lemmons, who also wrote the screenplay with Gregory Allen Howard. It stars Cynthia Erivo as abolitionist Harriet Tubman, with Leslie Odom Jr., Joe Alwyn, and Janelle Monáe in supporting roles. A biography about Harriet Tubman had been in the works for years, with several actresses, including Viola Davis, rumored to star. Erivo was cast in February 2017, and much of the cast and crew joined the following year. Filming took place in Virginia from October to December 2018.

Harriet had its world premiere at the Toronto International Film Festival on September 10, 2019, and was theatrically released in the United States on November 1, 2019, by Focus Features. It received generally favorable reviews from critics, who praised Erivo's performance and found the film sincere but formulaic, and was a moderate commercial success, grossing $43 million worldwide against its production budget of $17 million. The film received several accolades and nominations, particularly for Erivo's performance, which garnered her nominations at the Academy Awards, Golden Globes, and the Screen Actors Guild. For the song "Stand Up," Erivo and Joshuah Brian Campbell received Oscar, Grammy and Golden Globe nominations.

Plot 
In 1849 Maryland, a slave state, Araminta "Minty" Ross is newly married to freedman John Tubman. Minty is a slave on the Brodess plantation, along with her mother and sister. Reverend Green finishes his sermon advising obedience and to follow the Lord's will. Her father, also a freedman, approaches her owner, Edward Brodess, with a lawyer's letter saying that Minty's mother, Harriet "Rit" Ross, was to have been freed when she was 45 and her children born free. John and Harriet want to start a family and want their children to be born free. Brodess angrily tears up the letter.

In despair, Minty prays for God to kill Brodess and is caught by Brodess' adult son Gideon, who castigates her. When Brodess dies shortly afterward, Gideon offers Minty for sale. Minty, who suffers "spells" since being struck in the head as a girl, has a vision of herself escaping to freedom. She decrees these scenes as visions from God and decides to escape. John offers to accompany Minty, but she leaves him behind, fearing he would lose his freedom if caught with her. Minty meets with her father who tells her to go to Reverend Green for help with her journey.

Minty travels all night and is pursued by Gideon and other men on horseback. Eventually, Gideon corners her at a bridge over a river, where he appeals to her faith and even promises not to sell her. Minty jumps anyway, proclaiming her will to "be free or die". 

Minty is presumed drowned but successfully makes it to Wilmington, Delaware and locates the abolitionist Thomas Garrett. He takes her to the Pennsylvania border and Minty walks the remaining 25 miles to Philadelphia, where she meets William Still, chairman of the Pennsylvania Anti-Slavery Society. William encourages her to take a new free name and she chooses Harriet after her mother and Tubman after her husband. Harriet temporarily lodges at Marie Buchanon's, the daughter of a freed slave who was born free and is now a boarding-house proprietor.

After a year in Philadelphia, Harriet begs William to assist bringing her family over. He tells her helping slaves has become harder. Refusing to give up, Harriet successfully makes it to John's homestead with forged papers only to find he has remarried and is expecting a child. Devastated, Harriet receives further visions and is found by her father. With the exception of her parents and sister, Rachel, Harriet leads nine other slaves to safety, five of them being from Gideon's farm. The next day, Gideon realizes and threatens Rachel —who has just given birth—and her children. She reveals to Gideon that Harriet is alive and has recently returned. Gideon thinks this unlikely. Meanwhile, Harriet is admitted to the committee of the Underground Railroad for her actions.

Harriet continues to guide slaves to freedom as a conductor on the Underground Railroad, and is dubbed "Moses". However, Rachel is a house slave and will not run because Gideon has sold her children and she hopes one day to be told where they are. She meets Walter who had worked for Bigger Long as a slave catcher and decides to go with her. The  Fugitive Slave Act passes, meaning escaped slaves are in jeopardy of being brought back from free states. Harriet hears that Rachel has died.

Gideon is livid when he discovers that Harriet is "Moses". He pursues her to Philadelphia along with Bigger Long, who tortures and kills Marie. Harriet then flees to Canada with help from her friends. After receiving a vision that her father is in imminent danger, Harriet returns and takes both her parents north. Over time, the Brodess plantation falls into financial ruin. Brodess' widow vows to catch Harriet, using her sister's children as bait, but Harriet's team overwhelms Gideon's siblings and retrieves the remaining slaves.

In a final confrontation, Gideon shoots Bigger Long dead as he is about to kill Harriet. Harriet then traps Gideon, but allows him to live, prophesying that he would die on a battlefield fighting for the "Lost Cause" and the sin of slavery. Telling him that her people would be free, she takes his horse and rides away. Harriet later leads an armed expedition of 150 black soldiers into the Combahee River Raid. The epilogue describes some of her accomplishments: She personally freed more than 70 slaves and returned as a Union spy during the Civil War, leading 150 black soldiers, who freed over 750 slaves, and helped women's suffrage. She died at the approximate age of 91 with the last words: "I go to prepare a place for you".

Cast 

 Cynthia Erivo as Araminta "Minty" Ross / Harriet Tubman
 Leslie Odom Jr. as William Still, a Philadelphia abolitionist who connects Harriet with the Underground Railroad
 Joe Alwyn as Gideon Brodess, Harriet's last owner
 Clarke Peters as Ben Ross, Harriet's father
 Vanessa Bell Calloway as Rit Ross, Harriet's mother
 Vondie Curtis-Hall as Reverend Samuel Green, a secretly-abolitionist freedman
 Jennifer Nettles as Eliza Brodess, Gideon's mother
 Janelle Monáe as Marie Buchanon, the owner of a boarding house in Philadelphia who befriends Harriet
 Omar Dorsey as Bigger Long, a notorious black slave-catcher
 Tim Guinee as abolitionist Thomas Garrett
 Zackary Momoh as John Tubman, a freedman and husband of Harriet Tubman before her first escape attempt
 Deborah Ayorinde as Rachel Ross, Harriet's sister
 Henry Hunter Hall as Walter, a black slave-tracker who eventually switches to Harriet's side
 Tory Kittles as abolitionist Frederick Douglass
 Mike Marunde (credited as Michael Marunde) as Edward Brodess, Harriet's first owner and Gideon's father

Production
In 2015, Viola Davis was set to star in and produce a Harriet Tubman biopic; however, it never came to fruition. Development on a new film began in May 2016. In February 2017, Cynthia Erivo was cast as Tubman, with Seith Mann then set to direct, from a screenplay by Gregory Allen Howard.

Further development on the film was announced in September 2018, with Focus Features set as the new distributor, Kasi Lemmons attached as director (the first feature film she directed after the box office failure of Black Nativity.), and Leslie Odom Jr., Joe Alwyn, Jennifer Nettles, and Clarke Peters, and others, added to the cast. Lemmons received co-writer credit with Allen on the final script, and Allen also had the film's "story by" credit. In October, Janelle Monáe was announced as one of several actors newly added to the film, with filming beginning on October 8, 2018, and lasting through December.

Harriet was filmed entirely in Virginia, in Richmond, Powhatan, Tamworth, Petersburg, and Mathews. Berkeley Plantation in Charles City County was used for Auburn, New York.

Release
Harriet had its world premiere at the Toronto International Film Festival on September 10. It was theatrically released in the United States on November 1, 2019. Its release for Blu-ray and DVD sales took place on January 14, 2020.

Reception

Box office
Harriet grossed $43.1 million in the United States and Canada and $200,000 in other territories for a worldwide total of $43.3 million, plus $4.2 million with home video sales, against a production budget of $17 million. In North America, the film was released alongside Terminator: Dark Fate, Arctic Dogs and Motherless Brooklyn, and was projected to gross $7–9 million from 2,059 theaters in its opening weekend. The film grossed $3.9 million on its first day, including $600,000 from Thursday night previews. It went on to slightly over-perform, debuting to $11.7 million and finishing fourth. The film made $7.4 million in its second weekend, finishing sixth, and $4.6 million on its third, finishing tenth.

Critical response

The website's critics' consensus reads, "Harriet serves as a sincere tribute to a pivotal figure in American history—albeit one undermined by its frustratingly formulaic approach." Metacritic assigned the film a weighted average score of 66 out of 100, based on 41 critics, indicating "generally favorable reviews." Audiences polled by CinemaScore gave the film a rare grade of "A+," while those at PostTrak gave it an average 4.5 out of 5 stars and a 69% "definite recommend."

Reviewing for The New York Observer, Rex Reed wrote: "With enough terror to satisfy modern audiences and enough underplayed plot movement to save it from conventional biopic trajectory, Harriet holds interest and invites respect. It is still not the great Civil War epic it could have been, but it’s solid enough to work, and Cynthia Erivo's valiant and committed performance is a wonderful achievement." Richard Roeper gave the film three out of four stars in his review for the Chicago Sun-Times, applauding Erivo's "convincing" and "powerful" acting as well as Lemmons' approach to the story. He wrote: "The crackling historical fiction frames [Tubman's] harrowing rescue missions in fast-paced, quick-cut style."

Some reviewers were less positive. Eric Kohn of IndieWire gave the film a "B−",  writing that "Harriet doesn’t attempt to reinvent the biopic, relying instead on a poignant turn by rising screen talent Cynthia Erivo as its soulful centerpiece, against the gorgeous backdrop of John Toll's cinematography and Terence Blanchard's euphoric score. As a sentimental tribute, it hardly transcends expectations—but Erivo's performance injects a palpable urgency to the material that makes up for missed time." In Variety, Owen Gleiberman wrote, "Cynthia Erivo plays the escaped slave Harriet Tubman with a mournful fury, but the rest of Kasi Lemmons' biopic is more dutiful than inspired."

Accolades

See also
A Woman Called Moses, 1978 miniseries about Harriet Tubman 
 The Quest for Freedom, 1992 film about Tubman
List of black films of the 2010s
List of films featuring slavery

References

External links
 
 
 
 Harriet at History vs. Hollywood
Harriet at Rotten Tomatoes

2019 films
2019 biographical drama films
2010s historical drama films
African-American biographical dramas
African-American films
American biographical drama films
American historical drama films
Cultural depictions of Harriet Tubman
Films about American slavery
Films about racism in the United States
Films directed by Kasi Lemmons
Films scored by Terence Blanchard
Films set in 1849
Films set in 1850
Films set in 1858
Films set in the 1850s
Films set in 1863
Films set in Baltimore
Films set in Maryland
Films set in New York (state)
Films set in Ontario
Films set in Philadelphia
Films set in South Carolina
Films shot in Virginia
Western (genre) films based on actual events
Focus Features films
Perfect World Pictures films
Works about the Underground Railroad
2010s English-language films
2010s American films